The family Cossidae comprises the "leopard and goat moths", of which three occur in Great Britain:

Subfamily Zeuzerinae 
 Phragmataecia castaneae, reed leopard — east & south (Red Data Book)
 Zeuzera pyrina, leopard moth — east, south & central

Subfamily Cossinae 

 Cossus cossus, goat moth — throughout (nationally scarce B) ‡

Species listed in the 2007 UK Biodiversity Action Plan (BAP) are indicated by a double-dagger symbol (‡).

See also
List of moths of Great Britain (overview)
Family lists: Hepialidae, Cossidae, Zygaenidae, Limacodidae, Sesiidae, Lasiocampidae, Saturniidae, Endromidae, Drepanidae, Thyatiridae, Geometridae, Sphingidae, Notodontidae, Thaumetopoeidae, Lymantriidae, Arctiidae, Ctenuchidae, Nolidae, Noctuidae and Micromoths

References 

 Waring, Paul, Martin Townsend and Richard Lewington (2003) Field Guide to the Moths of Great Britain and Ireland. British Wildlife Publishing, Hook, UK. .

Moths of Great Britain (Cossidae)
Britain
Cossidae